Nikolai Lvovich Markov (9 January 1883 – 19 November 1957) was a Russian architect working in Iran.

Biography 
Prior to his decisive settling in Iran, Markov was a high-ranking member of the Imperial Russian army, and fought in the Caucasus against the Bolsheviks under Colonel Nikolai Baratov, the commander of the Russian forces in Iran and to whose staff he was attached, and had served with the fanatically anti-Bolshevik Major-General Lazar Bicherakov, another one of Baratov's senior officers. A staunch supporter of the White movement, in the years around and after the Bolshevik Revolution, he had served as a captain in the Persian Cossack Brigade under General Vsevolod Starosselsky as well. Nikolai Markov later worked for the Municipality of Tehran where he built many buildings. Alborz High School, the Post Office and Telecommunications of Tehran, factories and even a mosque. He was buried at the Doulab Cemetery.

Gallery

References 

1880s births
1957 deaths
Architects from Tbilisi
Military personnel of the Russian Empire
Military personnel from Tbilisi
White Russian emigrants to Iran
Iranian architects
Burials in Iran
Burials at Doulab Cemetery